Terrain Boss is the sixth studio album by American rapper Sean T. It was released October 25, 2003 on Get Gone Records and was produced by Sean T.

Track listing
"We Gangstas" - 0:36  
"Want War" - 4:24 (Featuring Young Noble, A-Wax, Eddie Projects) 
"Mo Murder" - 4:05  
"What Should I?" - 3:34  
"What Is It?" - 4:31 (Featuring Ten Dolla, Balance) 
"Get Ya Hands Up" - 4:26  
"Damn" - 3:20 (Featuring E-40, Keak da Sneak)
"Off Top" - 4:29 (Featuring Papoose, Mr. Sandman) 
"Lemme Hit It" - 3:59  
"Here 2 There" - 3:53  
"Hungry" - 4:00  
"We Are" - 4:17 (Featuring The Game, Blue Chip) 
"Who Want It?" - 3:56  
"In the Streets" - 4:08  
"Party Wit Us" - 4:36  
"Makin' Me High" - 7:50 (Featuring Prohoezak, Mr. Kee) 
"Terrain Talk" - 3:46 (Featuring Mr. Sandman, Roddy Bo) 
"Toe Up" - 3:15 (Featuring Mistah F.A.B.) 
"I Choose You" - 4:13 (Featuring Missippi)
"Groove" - 3:51 (Featuring Ghazi) 
"Papa" - 4:07

Sean T albums
2003 albums